Bartholomew Columbus (– 1515) was an Italian  explorer from Genoa and the younger brother of Christopher Columbus.

Biography
Born in Genoa, then the capital city of the Republic of Genoa, in the 1460s Bartholomew was a mapmaker in Lisbon, the principal center of cartography of the time, and conceived with his brother the "Enterprise of the Indies", a planned expedition to reach the Orient and its lucrative spice trade by a western rather than an eastern route. In 1489 he went to England to seek assistance from Henry VII for the execution of the expedition. He was taken by pirates and landed in England in a destitute condition, and on presenting himself at Court was unfavorably received. He then sought help at the court of Charles VIII in France, again without success.

Meanwhile, his brother Christopher was in Castile trying to persuade Isabella I of Castile and Ferdinand II of Aragon to back the expedition.  When word arrived in 1493 that his brother had succeeded, Bartholomew returned to Spain, where he missed Christopher, who had already left on the second voyage of his four to the "New World".

Funded by the Crown, Bartholomew Columbus traveled to Hispaniola in 1494 to meet his brother, where he was appointed as an Adelantado, a senior-ranking governor, during his brother's absences. He founded the city of Santo Domingo on Hispaniola between 1496 and 1498, which is now the capital of the Dominican Republic. He was imprisoned together with Christopher and another brother, Giacomo (also called Diego), by Francisco de Bobadilla and returned to Spain in December 1500.

After the Court acquitted Christopher Columbus of all of the charges, the Crown funded Christopher Columbus's fourth and last voyage to the West Indies.  Bartholomew accompanied his brother on this final 'New World' voyage, and was to be left with a garrison near the Belén River.  Bartholomew's men were attacked by the local Ngäbe leader, El Quibían.

On 30 July 1502, they arrived at Guanaja, one of the Bay Islands off the coast of Honduras. Christopher sent his brother to scout the island. As Bartholomew explored, a large trading canoe approached. Bartholomew Columbus boarded the canoe, and found it was a Maya trading vessel from Yucatán, carrying well-dressed Maya and a rich cargo. The Europeans looted whatever took their interest from amongst the cargo and seized the elderly captain to serve as an interpreter; the canoe was then allowed to continue on its way. This was the first recorded contact between Europeans and the Maya. It is likely that news of the piratical strangers in the Caribbean passed along the Maya trade routes – the first prophecies of bearded invaders sent by Kukulkan, the northern Maya feathered serpent god, were probably recorded around this time, and in due course passed into the books of Chilam Balam.

Following Christopher Columbus's death in Spain in 1506, Bartholomew returned to the Antilles in 1509, accompanying his nephew Diego, but Bartholomew soon returned to Spain when King Ferdinand II of Aragon confirmed his concession involving Mona Island near Puerto Rico; the King would reclaim the appealing little island from Bartholomew's heirs after Bartholomew's death on 12 August 1514 (by which time Bartholomew had returned to Hispaniola).

Bartholomew Columbus is known to have fathered a daughter out of wedlock, named Maria and born in 1508.

Legacy
The island of Saint Barthélemy in the Caribbean was named in his honour by Christopher Columbus.

References

Sources 
 English edition:

External links 
Bartolomé Colómbo

Explorers from the Republic of Genoa
Bartholomew
Italian explorers
Italian explorers of North America
Colonial governors of Santo Domingo
Dominican Republic people of Italian descent
1460s births
1515 deaths
Spanish West Indies